This is a sub-article to Białystok
The city of Białystok is divided into 29 administrative units known in Polish as osiedle (housing estate, or residential neighborhood; plural: osiedla). The first 27 of these were created by City Council bylaw no. XXXI/331/04 of October 25, 2004. The 28th, Dojlidy Górne, was created by City Council bylaw no. LXII/787/06 of October 23, 2006, out of three settlements which had been incorporated into the city: Dojlidy Górne, Kolonia Halickie, and Zagórki. A new district called Bagnówka was created at the beginning of 2021.

Osiedla of the city of Białystok

References 

  Bulletin of Białystok City Hall: City Council resolutions on the administrative division of the city